The members of the thirteenth National Assembly of South Korea were elected on 26 April 1988. The Assembly sat from 30 May 1988 until 29 May 1992.

Members

Seoul

Busan

Daegu

Incheon

Gwangju

Gyeonggi

Gangwon

North Chungcheong

South Chungcheong

North Jeolla

South Jeolla

North Gyeongsang

South Gyeongsang

Jeju

Proportional representation

Notes

References

013
National Assembly members 013